Hume's wheatear (Oenanthe albonigra) is a species of bird in the family Muscicapidae. It is found in Afghanistan, Bahrain, India, Iran, Iraq, Kuwait, Oman, Pakistan, Qatar, and the United Arab Emirates.

The name commemorates the British naturalist Allan Octavian Hume, who worked in India.

References

Hume's wheatear
Birds of the Middle East
Birds of Afghanistan
Birds of Pakistan
Hume's wheatear
Taxonomy articles created by Polbot
Birds of Iran